The 2021–22 Serie D was the seventy-third season of the top level Italian non-professional football championship. It represents the fourth tier in the Italian football league system.

Rules 
The season will provide a total nine promotions to Serie C (those being the winners of all nine groups). Teams placed between second and fifth for each group will play a so-called "playoff tournament", starting with two one-legged games played at the best placed team's home venue:

 2nd-placed team vs 5th-placed team;
 3rd-placed team vs 4th-placed team.

In case of a draw by the end of the game, two extra times will be played; in case of no winner after that, the best-placed team will advance to the final.

The two winning teams will then play a one-legged final, to be hosted at the best placed team's home venue, with the same rules as in the first round. The nine playoff winners for each group will be prioritised to fill any potential Serie C league vacancies.

The two bottom-placed teams for each league group are automatically relegated to Eccellenza. Two two-legged relegation playoff games (known in Italian as "play-out") will therefore be played between:

 13th-placed team vs 16th-placed team (for 18-team groups), or 15th-placed team vs 18th-placed team (for 20-team groups);
 14th-placed team vs 15th-placed team (for 18-team groups), or 16th-placed team vs 17th-placed team (for 20-team groups).

In case of an aggregate draw after the second leg, two extra times will be played; in case of further aggregate draw, the worst-placed team will be relegated.

In case the two teams will have a league gap of at least eight points, the relegation playoff will not take place and the worst-placed team will be automatically relegated instead.

Teams 
The composition of the league involves nine divisions, grouped geographically and named alphabetically.

Teams relegated from Serie C 
Five teams were directly relegated from the 2020–21 Serie C: Fano, Ravenna, Arezzo, Bisceglie, Cavese.

Novara were admitted via Article 52 of N.O.I.F.

Casertana and Sambenedettese, originally excluded from Serie C, were later readmitted to Serie D by sentence of the Regional Administrative Court of Lazio.

Teams promoted from Eccellenza 
The following teams were promoted from Eccellenza:

Abruzzo
 Chieti
Apulia
 Virtus Matino
Calabria
 Lamezia Terme
Campania
 San Giorgio
 Mariglianese
Emilia Romagna
 Borgo San Donnino
Lazio
 UniPomezia
 Real Monterotondo Scalo

Liguria
 Ligorna
Lombardy
 Brianza Olginatese
 Leon
 Alcione
Marche
 Porto d'Ascoli
Molise
 Aurora Alto Casertano
Piedmont & Aosta Valley
 Asti
 RG Ticino
Sardinia
 Atletico Uri

Sicily
 Sancataldese
 Giarre
Trentino Alto Adige – Südtirol
 Levico Terme
Tuscany
 Poggibonsi
 Cascina
Veneto
 Spinea
 San Martino Speme

Changes during the season 
On 15 December 2021, debt-ridden FC Messina was excluded from the league with  immediate effect due to having failed to show up for two consecutive league games; as the exclusion happened before mid-season, all previous games involving the club were voided.

Group A

Group B

Group C

Group D

Group E

Group F

Group G

Group H

Group I

Poule Scudetto

Group 1 

|}

Group 2 

|}

Group 3 

|}

Final stage

Notes

References 

4
Serie D seasons
Italy